Espárrago and/or Esparrago may refer to:
Víctor Espárrago (born 1944), Uruguayan football coach
Espárrago Rock festival, Grenada, Spain

See also
espárragos - asparagus
Esparragosa de Lares, Spain
Esparragosa de la Serena, Spain